Noisebridge is an anarchistic maker and hackerspace located in San Francisco, inspired by European hackerspaces Metalab and c-base in Berlin.  It describes itself as "a space for sharing, creation, collaboration, research, development, mentoring, and learning," and outside of its headquarters forms a wider international community.  It was organized in 2007 and has had permanent facilities since 2008.

Organization 

Noisebridge allows anyone to contribute, including non-members. All workshops and activities are free, with some exceptions for materials costs, and all are open to the public. It is a registered non-profit California corporation, with IRS 501(c)(3) charitable status, a Board of Directors, and volunteer officers including a President, Treasurer, and Secretary.

History

Locations 
During most of 2007 and 2008, Noisebridge was a group of people meeting in new
locations weekly. In October 2008, the Noisebridge group began renting a small commercial property in San Francisco's Mission District; it quickly
outgrew that location. 

In 2009, the space moved into 2169 Mission St., a 5,200 square foot space on the third floor of the building. Early in its history, in 2009, Noisebridge had around 100 members. 

By 2018, the organization was looking for a new space as its lease was under threat.  A large donation in 2020 kicked off a new search. The group then moved to its current space at 272 Capp Street, directly behind its former building.

Activities and projects 

Many meetups, workshops, and classes are held at the space, including the long running Circuit Hacking Monday, San Francisco Writers Workshop, Wikipedia meetups, Hack Comedy, Five Minutes of Fame, game development groups and classes, Free Code Camp, Code Day, and the Stupid Hackathon. 

Past workspaces prior to June 2018 included: an optics lab, bycology lab, biotech lab, bitchen, digital audio workstation photo development darkroom, book scanning workshop, photo booth, and a lights-out cloud computing lab  with more than 100 computer cores and contributed resources to several open source projects, including the GCC compile farm.

Noisebridge members have been involved with research projects that won the best paper awards from top tier academic conferences Usenix Security Conference and CRYPTO.

Media coverage 

Noisebridge has been covered by international media for a myriad of projects involving their membership, including NPR, the BBC, the BBC World Service, Wired, The New Yorker, The Guardian, CNET,  Le Monde, Heise Online, ORF, Irish Times, Die Welt Online, Die Zeit Online, and Der Standard.

Physical space 

Noisebridge is located at 272 Capp Street, a 6000-square-foot commercial space in San Francisco's Mission District. The current space has many workspaces, which change dynamically. As of Nov 2022 these include two outdoor patios, a laser cutter, wood shop, 3D and 2D print shop, sewing workshop, music room, vintage video game archive, paper book library, and electronics workroom.

Community participation 

Noisebridge members have spoken internationally at events including Defcon, Blackhat, The Chaos Computer Club's Chaos Communication Congress, CCC Camps, and HOPE, presented at the local event Maker Faire, and contributed to the founding of hackerspaces elsewhere. 

Noisebridge is part of the Bay Area Consortium of Hackerspaces, along with sister spaces sudo room, Double Union, and Ace Monster Toys.

Spacebridge 

Noisebridge had a near space exploration program in 2010, which launched weather-balloon probes exploring altitudes of nearly 70,000 feet, carrying a variety of smartphones and digital cameras for imaging and altitude sensing using a GPS system. Altitudes reached have exceeded the operational limits of consumer level GPS systems.

NoiseTor 
NoiseTor (or Noisebridge Tor Project) was a Noisebridge initiative to create and operate additional Tor relays. The project accepted financial donations to sponsor additional nodes.
The project was shut down officially by 2022.

Awards and honors 

 Noisebridge won the SF Bay Guardian 2010 Best of the Bay award as "Best Open Source Playground"; the review concluded, "the vibe is welcoming and smart."

 In 2011 the SF Weekly awarded Noisebridge Best of San Francisco as "Best Hacker Playground", describing it as "the ultimate in DIY ethic" and noting its "distinctive sense of humor."

Controversies 
As of 2013, many women have reported instances of being sexually harassed and assaulted at Noisebridge. Co-founder Jacob Appelbaum was accused of multiple instances of sexual harassment. In June 2016, amid an uptick in accusations against Appelbaum and statements from various other groups banning him from their spaces, Noisebridge did the same, stating in an official blog post that "Jacob is no longer welcome in our community, either in its physical or online spaces". In their statement, they explained that his alleged actions (as well as those of other Noisebridge participants accused of harassement), although they had occurred before its instating in 2014, were in violation of their Anti-Harassment policy.

Cultural references 
The hackerspace features prominently in Cory Doctorow's 2013 novel Homeland. 

It also influenced Annalee Newitz's novel Autonomous, which was partially written at Noisebridge.

The video game Watch Dogs 2 was reportedly influenced by Noisebridge.

References

External links 

 Official website

Culture of San Francisco
DIY culture
Education in San Francisco
Hackerspaces in the San Francisco Bay Area
Non-profit organizations based in San Francisco